Cundell is a surname. Notable people with the surname include:

 Edric Cundell (1893–1961), British music teacher, composer and conductor
 Henry Cundell (1810–1886), Scottish painter, artist, and early photographer
 Len Cundell (1879-1939), English horse trainer
 Nora Cundell (1889–1948), English painter
 Pamela Cundell (1920–2015), English character actress

See also
 Cundall (disambiguation)